is a Japanese footballer currently playing as a defender for Ehime FC as a designated special player.

Career statistics

Club
.

Notes

References

External links

1999 births
Living people
Association football people from Osaka Prefecture
Osaka University of Health and Sport Sciences alumni
Japanese footballers
Association football defenders
J2 League players
Ehime FC players